The men's 30 kilometre classical cross-country skiing competition at the 1992 Winter Olympics in Albertville, France, was held on Monday 10 February in Les Saisies.

Each skier started at half a minute intervals, skiing the entire 30 kilometre course. The Swede Gunde Svan was the 1991 World champion and Alexey Prokurorov of the Soviet Union was the defending Olympic champion from 1988 Olympics in Calgary, Canada. Svan retired in 1991 and did not participate in this event.

Results
Sources:

References

External links
 Final results (International Ski Federation)

Men's cross-country skiing at the 1992 Winter Olympics
Men's 30 kilometre cross-country skiing at the Winter Olympics